Abdul Ghafoor Majna (3 August 1938 – 7 September 2012) was a Pakistani professional footballer, who played as a midfielder. Ghafoor was also the former captain of Pakistan national football team. He was nicknamed the "Pakistani Pele" and "Black Pearl of Pakistan".

International career 
Ghafoor made his national team debut in 1959 after receiving a call-up from coach McBride. His first tours were to Burma and Indo-china. He was part of Pakistan national football team setup when it was among the top 10 teams of Asia. According to The Express Tribune, he was "the last man alive from the days when the Pakistan football team was good enough to beat USSR, UAE and China – a far cry from the state of affairs right now". He served as the team's captain for 11 years.

Club career
He began his career in 1957, representing his local side Saifi Sports (Lyari). He played in the 1958 All-Pakistan President's Cup for the Sindh Government Press. He also led Karachi Kickers to victory in the Aga Khan Gold Cup the same year. He played in Dhaka in the 1960s and before that, he represented Mohammedan Sporting Club (MSC) at the age of 14 in the Calcutta Football League in India, and Karachi League, Pakistan. He later founded Saifi Club in Karachi.

Personal life
Ghafoor was born in Saifi Lane, Baghdadi, a neighbourhood of Lyari in Karachi in British India. When playing for Mohammedan Sporting Club (MSC) in Dhaka, Ghafoor met his wife Sabiha and then later they married. His wife Sabiha also had a predilection for football. The couple then later lived in Lyari, Karachi. Ghafoor's sons are footballers too. His son Abdul Ghani has played football for different domestic teams. And his other son Abdul Waheed has also played for Pakistan Army FC.

Death
Ghafoor died in Lyari, Karachi  on 7 September 2012 after suffering from a paralysis attack four years prior. Ghafoor left behind two sons and three daughters.

Honours
Club
Karachi Kickers (West Pakistan)
 Aga Khan Gold Cup :
 Champion: 1958

Mohammedan SC (Calcutta)
 Aga Khan Gold Cup :
 Champion: 1960

Mohammedan SC (Dhaka)
 Aga Khan Gold Cup :
 Runner up: 1961
 Dhaka League (4):
 Champion: 1961, 1965, 1966, 1969
 Pakistan championship :
 Champion: 1961/62

Victoria SC (East Pakistan)
 Aga Khan Gold Cup :
 Champion: 1962
 Dhaka League (2):
 Champion: 1962, 1964

International
Pakistan National Team
 Merdeka Cup :
 Runners up: 1962

References

External links
Interview Football Pakistan
All About Pakistani Pele - Abdul Ghafoor

1941 births
2012 deaths
Pakistani footballers
Pakistan international footballers
Footballers from Karachi
People from Lyari Town
Mohammedan SC (Dhaka) players
Association football midfielders
Pakistani expatriate footballers
Pakistani expatriates in India
Calcutta Football League players